Aïn Ben Khelil is a town and commune in Naâma Province, Algeria. It is part of the district of Mécheria and has a population of 6,270, which gives it 7 seats in the PMA. Its postal code is 45140 and its municipal code is 4512.

Mécheria District
Communes of Naâma Province